Saint-Adelme is a parish municipality in the Canadian province of Quebec, located in La Matanie Regional County Municipality in the Bas-Saint-Laurent region.

Demographics 

See also
 List of parish municipalities in Quebec

References

Parish municipalities in Quebec
Incorporated places in Bas-Saint-Laurent